The 1963 Eastern Michigan Hurons football team represented Eastern Michigan University as an independent during the 1963 NCAA College Division football season. In their 12th season under head coach Fred Trosko, the Hurons compiled a 2–6 record and were outscored by their opponents, 201 to 96. The team's two victories were against Kalamazoo College and Adrian College. Dempster Ross and Terry Hurley were the team captains.

Schedule

References

Eastern Michigan
Eastern Michigan Eagles football seasons
Eastern Michigan Hurons football